Clyde Phillips may refer to:

 Clyde Phillips (horse trainer) (1891–1946), American racehorse trainer
 Clyde Phillips (writer), American writer and producer
 Clyde Phillips, “real” name of Suicide Squad villain Punch